Mount Useful is a mountain located to the west of Licola in Victoria, Australia. The mountain has basalt cliffs with columnar jointing on the east and south-east sides.

A fire lookout tower and a communications tower (primarily utilised by Telstra) are located on the summit.

See also

Alpine National Park
List of mountains in Victoria

References

Useful
Victorian Alps